Masashi Hosoya (born October 2, 1989), nicknamed Mashi,  is a Japanese professional basketball player who plays for the SeaHorses Mikawa of the B.League in Japan. He played college basketball for Kanto Gakuin University.  On October 9, 2016, he recorded a career-high 39 points in a win to the San-en NeoPhoenix. The Ninomiya town native played soccer in his youth, and he is good at ball juggling.

Career statistics

Regular season 

|-
| align="left" |  2012-13
| align="left"  rowspan="2" |  TGI・D-Rise
|  || || ||  ||  ||  ||  ||  ||  ||  ||  ||
|-
| align="left" | 2013-14
|32  ||31 ||35.2 ||.397  ||.354  ||.805  ||0.3  ||3.4  ||0.8  ||0.1  ||3.4  ||16.9
|-
| align="left" | 2014-15
| align="left"  rowspan="1" | Hyogo
|52 ||8 ||13.0 ||.319  ||.269 ||.875  ||0.1  || 0.7 ||0.2  ||0.0  ||0.6  || 3.1
|-
| align="left" | 2015-16
| align="left"  rowspan="1" | Tsukuba
|53  ||35 ||24.9 ||.393  ||.335  ||.771  ||0.3  ||2.2  ||0.5  ||0.0  ||1.8  || 8.2
|-
| align="left" |2016-17
| align="left"  rowspan="3" | Yokohama
|56  ||42 ||26.8 ||.405  ||.364  ||.782 ||0.4  ||2.3  || 0.6 ||0.1  || 1.3 || 7.1
|-
| align="left" |  2017-18
|58  ||47 ||23.2 ||.398  ||.356  ||.857  ||0.2  ||3.3  ||0.7  ||0.0  || 1.3 || 7.1
|-
| align="left" |  2018-19
|55  ||8 ||19.9 ||.404  ||.353  ||.763  ||1.4  ||2.2  ||0.5  ||0.0  ||1.1  || 7.2
|-
| align="left" | 2019-20
| align="left" rowspan="2"  | Akita
|37 ||12 ||18.6 ||.408  ||.347 ||.806  ||1.5  || 2.9 ||0.5  ||0.0  ||1.2  || 8.6
|-
| align="left" | 2020-21
|59 ||4 ||13.9 ||.384  ||.325 ||.904  ||0.6  || 1.8 ||0.2  ||0.0  ||0.9  || 6.5
|-
|}

Playoffs 

|-
|style="text-align:left;"|2016-17
|style="text-align:left;"|Yokohama
| 4 ||4  || 20:06 || .364 || .222 || 1.000 || 2.3 || 1.3 || 0.25 || 0.25 || 5.0
|-
|style="text-align:left;"|2016-17
|style="text-align:left;"|Yokohama
| 1 || 1 || 24:12 || .333 || .200 || 1.000 || 4.0 || 3.0 || 0.0 || 0.0 || 7.0
|-
|style="text-align:left;"|2017-18
|style="text-align:left;"|Yokohama
| 4 || 3 || 20:35 || .500 || .357 || 1.000 || 2.0 || 2.0 || 0.5 || 0.0 || 8.8
|-
|style="text-align:left;"|2018-19
|style="text-align:left;"|Yokohama
| 3 || 0 || 6:38 || .300 || .200 || .000 || 0.0 || 0.3 || 0.33 || 0.0 || 2.3
|-

Early cup games 

|-
|style="text-align:left;"|2017
|style="text-align:left;"|Yokohama
| 2 || 2 || 25:53 || .364 || .286 || 1.000 || 2.5 || 4.0 || 0.0 || 0.0 || 7.0
|-
|style="text-align:left;"|2018
|style="text-align:left;"|Yokohama
|2 || 2 || 24:34 || .286 || .286 || .000 || 1.5 || 3.5 || 0.0 || 0.0 || 5.0
|-
|style="text-align:left;"|2019
|style="text-align:left;"|Akita
|2 || 0 || 20:38 || .444 || .462 || .889 || 2.0 || 1.0 || 0.5 || 0.0 || 15.0
|-

Preseason games

|-
| align="left" |2019
| align="left" | Akita
| 3 || 1 || 18.8 || .448 ||.389  || .667||2.0 || 2.3|| 1.7 || 0.0 ||  13.0
|-

Source: UtsunomiyaToyamaSendai

External links

References

1989 births
Living people
Akita Northern Happinets players
Cyberdyne Ibaraki Robots players
TGI D-Rise players
Japanese men's basketball players
Nishinomiya Storks players
Sportspeople from Kanagawa Prefecture
Yokohama B-Corsairs players
Point guards